Herbert Hayton Castens (23 November 1864 – 18 October 1929) was a South African rugby union footballer and cricketer. He captained South Africa at both rugby and cricket, and played an important role in the development of rugby and cricket in South Africa, both on and off the field. He was usually known as H. H. Castens.

Biography

Early life
Born in Pearston in the Cape Colony, Castens was educated at Rugby School in England, where the sport of rugby is thought to have been created. He played both cricket and rugby, and was an outstanding athlete during his youth. He studied law at Oxford University, where in 1887, he obtained a rugby Blue. He was elected President of Vincent's Club. While studying, Castens played rugby for Middlesex and the South of England. Upon completing his studies at Oxford, he returned to South Africa, where he practised law in Cape Town.

Rugby career
Castens joined the Villagers Rugby Football Club, the second oldest rugby club in South Africa, in the southern suburbs of Cape Town. In 1890-91 he also represented the Western Province cricket team at the fifth Champion Bat Tournament in Cape Town as an opening batsman and wicket-keeper. He scored 165 against Eastern Province, the highest score of the three-match tournament.

In 1891, the British Isles rugby team toured South Africa. Castens refereed the first tour match, which was a combined Cape Town rugby side against the British Isles. Two days later he was appointed manager of the Western Province rugby side.

On 30 July, he captained South Africa in their first rugby international, against the British Isles team, which was played at the Crusader's Ground in Port Elizabeth. The British side scored two tries and a conversion to win the contest four to nil. Castens played in the front row in his one and only test. He thus became the first (and likely only) man to ever referee and play in matches in the same rugby test series. He also refereed a number of other matches in the tour: Port Elizabeth Clubs, Cape Colony, and the third and final test at Newlands on September 5, and won four to nil by Britain. Managing Western Province, he also played for them in their match against the tourists. He also refereed the unofficial final match of the tour against Stellenbosch. Castens is thought to be one of South Africa's first active rugby coaches; he believed that rugby was somewhat of a science.

Test history

Cricket career

In March 1894, the year that the South African Cricket Association was established, Castens captained Western Province to victory in the final of the Currie Cup tournament at Newlands in Cape Town, scoring 61 in an innings victory over Natal. Soon after, a South African cricket tour to England was organised, with Castens appointed as the captain. South Africa played matches against the first-class counties, but no Tests or first-class matches were played. 24 games were played on the tour, with 12 victories, five losses and seven draws. Castens scored 58 against Surrey.

Later life
Castens later moved to Southern Rhodesia, where he worked as an advocate, and was later elected to the National Legislature, and served as secretary to the government for a number of years. Castens died on 18 October 1929 in Fulham, London, at the age of sixty-four.

See also
 List of South Africa national rugby union players – Springbok no. 9
 South African rugby union captains

References

External links
Herbert Hayton Castens 1864 - 1929
For South Africa Captain of Rugby Captain of Cricket

1864 births
1929 deaths
People from Blue Crane Route Local Municipality
South African rugby union players
South Africa international rugby union players
Rugby union number eights
South African cricketers
Western Province cricketers
South African rugby union referees
Villager FC players
Rugby union players from the Eastern Cape